Halmajugra is a village in Heves County, Hungary.

The village was formed in 1950 from the merger of Gyöngyöshalmaj and Hevesugra. It is located 10 kilometers from Gyöngyös and 5 kilometers north of Main road 3. The neighbouring towns are Detk, Ludas and Visonta. The village is bordered to the east by the Bene Creek and to the north by the Borhy Valley Creek.

References

Populated places in Heves County